Frank Brown Park is a  outdoor recreation facility in Panama City Beach, Florida. The park hosts various sporting events throughout the year, and has facilities available for public use.

Events
Organizations such as the Ironman Florida Triathlon, United States Specialty Sports Association, National Softball Association, Grand Slam Baseball, United States Fastpitch Association, Independent Softball Association, World Softball League and the International Flag Football Association hold championship events at the Frank Brown facilities.

Facilities

The park has undergone over $10 million worth of expansions and renovations since 2002, including the addition of an aquatic center.
An additional $7.5 million in renovations to the park are currently being proposed by the Bay County Tourist Development Council.

Notes

External links
Frank Brown Park Web site: About Us
Convention and Visitor’s Bureau Sports Web Site: About Us

Parks in Florida
Baseball venues in Florida
Softball venues in Florida
Parks in Bay County, Florida
Sports complexes in Florida